Pa Daet is a tambon (subdistrict) of Mae Suai District, in Chiang Rai Province, Thailand. In 2016 it had a population of 11,852 people.

Administration

Central administration
The tambon is divided into 22 administrative villages (mubans).

Local administration
The area of the subdistrict is covered by the subdistrict administrative organization (SAO) Pa Daet (องค์การบริหารส่วนตำบลป่าแดด).

References

External links
Thaitambon.com on Pa Daet

Tambon of Chiang Rai province
Populated places in Chiang Rai province